Emergency Provisions are contained in Part Eighteen of the Constitution of India. The President of India has the power to impose emergency rule in any or all the Indian states if the security of part or all of India is threatened by "war or external aggression or armed rebellion".

1971
The Fifth Assembly was constituted on 15 March 1971 after the General Elections held in March 1971. It consisted of 234 elected members of which 42 seats were reserved for Scheduled Castes and 2 for Scheduled Tribes besides one nominated member. Before the expiry of the period of the Assembly, the President by a Proclamation issued on 31 January 1976, under article 356 of the Constitution, dissolved the Fifth Assembly and imposed President's Rule for the first time in Tamil Nadu.

1985
The Eighth Assembly was constituted on 16 January 1985 after the General Elections held on 24 December 1984. Before the expiry of the period of Assembly, the President by a proclamation issued on 30 January 1988, under Article 356 of the Constitution dissolved the Eighth Tamil Nadu Legislative Assembly and imposed President's Rule in Tamil Nadu.

1989
The Ninth Tamil Nadu Legislative Assembly was constituted on 27 January 1989 after the General Elections held on 21 January 1989. Before the expiry of the term of the Assembly, the President by a Proclamation issued on 30 January 1991, under Article 356 of the Constitution of India dissolved the Ninth Tamil Nadu Legislative Assembly and imposed President's Rule in Tamil Nadu.

Final Table

See also
Constitution of India
President of India
State of Emergency in India
The Emergency (India)

References

External links 

 History of dismissals of Tamilnadu Assembly

Constitution of India
Emergency laws